May Khin Kanyar is a 2012 Burmese comedy-drama film, directed by Ko Zaw (Ar Yone Oo) starring Yan Aung, Khant Si Thu, Pyay Ti Oo, Kyaw Kyaw Bo, Soe Myat Thuzar, Eaindra Kyaw Zin, Wutt Hmone Shwe Yi and Thinzar Wint Kyaw. The film, produced by Shwe Min Thamee Film Production premiered Myanmar on 2012.

Cast
Yan Aung as U Bala
Khant Si Thu as San Thar Yaung
Pyay Ti Oo as Nyan Thar Yaung
Kyaw Kyaw Bo as Kan Thar Yaung
Soe Myat Thuzar as Daw Pearl
Eaindra Kyaw Zin as May Khin Kanyar
Wutt Hmone Shwe Yi as Chit Chit
Thinzar Wint Kyaw as Shwe Sin
Khin Hlaing as Mutu
Aye Mya Phyu (Cameo)

References

2012 films
2010s Burmese-language films
Burmese comedy-drama films
Films shot in Myanmar